Ampumixis is a genus of riffle beetles in the family Elmidae. There is one described species in Ampumixis, A. dispar.

References

Further reading

 
 
 
 
 

Elmidae
Articles created by Qbugbot